Ash Hashim (born 16 November), better known as Fútbolita™ is a Singaporean sports journalist and TV personality, a FIFA Players' Agent, and entrepreneur known as the "Female Voice of Football". Her website and brand, Futbolita (Futbolita.com), is known for featuring exclusive interviews with world-renowned sports personalities in the European football world, including David Villa, Xavi, Fernando Torres, Cristiano Ronaldo, Romário and José Mourinho.

In November 2013, Ash received her official Players' Agent License from FIFA and FAS, enabling her to represent and work with international players. She was also the first female agent within the region to do so, and has negotiated deals in Thailand, Malaysia and the Middle East.

Based in Asia, Ash has also worked as a sports presenter and pundit in Singapore and Malaysia and she explores and examines football culture and information in a uniquely feminine voice. She has presented for Eleven Sports Network (Singapore), Starhub and Singtel TV as well as Astro in Malaysia. She has also presented the Premier League, UEFA Euro 2016, La Liga and Serie A for these networks. She also penned the 'Futbolita' column for Yahoo! and NXT Tech magazine in Singapore.

Futbolita is also known for its social media coverage and has collaborated with football clubs and associations such as the Bundesliga, Paris Saint-Germain, and La Liga to provide content for fans in Asia. Fútbolita has been listed in The Guardian's Top 100 Football Blogs To Follow in 2011].

Career 
Ash's journalism career started at The New Paper in 2006, where she reported on local sports for a few years while completing her media diploma. In 2010, she joined Yahoo! as a freelance correspondent  while completing her degree at Monash University.

Ash founded Fútbolita in November 2008 to accommodate growing requests from international friends to read her interviews with sports personalities.

Fútbolita is also known for its more serious approach to football from a female perspective, where tactics, player development and background information are reviewed. The site also reveals the 'lighter' and fun side of the game, which is of interest to the site's male and female following through its weekly 'Los Chicas Chismes' (Offbeat Gossip) column. The Seleção Bootcamp, which follows the Brazilian national team, Futbolita Interview and Sunday Señor are three of the site's most popular features. Recurring series such as La Liga Lunes, Premiership Party, Serie A Sister and The Friday Crackovia Club are also widely read on the site.

In June 2010, she started up the Fútbolita World Cup to coincide with the 2010 FIFA World Cup in South Africa. Twelve girls from various nations contributed to the site in a month which saw close to 400,000 unique visitors.

In January 2011, Ash announced a partnership  between the Spanish Tourism Board and  Futbolita, to further promote the culture of the country to her international readers. She did an extensive football trip involving clubs in Madrid, Barcelona, Valencia and a cultural tour in Salamanca and Cuenca.

In July 2011, Fútbolita launched its own web channel Futbolita.TV, with exclusive videos and interviews featuring English Premier League teams Arsenal, Liverpool and Chelsea.

In 2019, Ash Hashim became the first Southeast Asian personality to moderate a women's football panel at the Dubai Globe Soccer Awards and International Sports Conference, attended by Cristiano Ronaldo and other global football stars.

Interviews 
Ash's interviews with world football personalities are a hit with readers in Asia, the United States, South America, and Europe. She is also known to be passionate and enthusiastic about the sport, and often shares her funny experiences, when she gets up close and personal with various football personalities.

Some of the players she has interviewed include Sergio Agüero, Xavi, Cristiano Ronaldo, Luís Fabiano, Carlos Marchena, Víctor Valdés, André Santos, Ricardo Carvalho, Felipe Melo, David de Gea, David Silva, Ricardo Costa, Dani Alves, Nani, Lucas Leiva, Nilmar, Alexandre Pato, Carlos Vela, Dirk Kuyt and more.

Background 
Ash speaks English, Spanish and conversational Portuguese. She is of Welsh, Malaysian, Pakistani and Arab descent and often mentions her grandfather and father as the key influences in her life.

References

External links
Futbolita
Futbolita TV
Profile on Yahoo! S.E.A

Living people
Sports journalists
1988 births
Singaporean people of Arab descent
Singaporean people of Pakistani descent
Singaporean people of British descent